KRHW  is a radio station broadcasting a classic country radio format.  Licensed to Sikeston, Missouri, the station serves the Missouri Bootheel region of Southeast Missouri, and operates on 1520 kHz in the AM radio band.  KRHW is owned by Withers Broadcasting Company of Southeast Missouri, LLC.

KRHW's skywave signal has been received as far north as the Quad Cities and Chicago and as far south as New Orleans.  However, KRHW must protect the nighttime skywave signals of Class A clear-channel stations KOKC Oklahoma City and WWKB in Buffalo, which also transmit on 1520 kHz. The station reduces its power from 5,000 watts in the daytime to 1,600 watts at night. KRHW has an extremely directional antenna pattern aimed to the north and south with deep nulls to the east and west.  It uses a six-tower array to achieve its complex nighttime signal.

Prior to August 17, 1997, the station's call sign was KMPL.

Translators
KRHW broadcasts on FM translator K255AW at 98.9 MHz to help make up for the shortfall in the station's nighttime signal to the east and west of the main AM station's transmitter site which includes Sikeston, and many surrounding rural portions of Scott and New Madrid counties, as well as Stoddard County to the west, Mississippi County to the east, and even far southwestern portions of Cape Girardeau County, far southeastern portions of Bollinger County, and the areas of Alexander County in extreme southern Illinois just west of Cairo and southeast of Cape Girardeau proper.  The transmitter site for K255AW is located along the Scott–Stoddard county line.

Sources

External links
KRHW's official website

RHW
Country radio stations in the United States
Radio stations established in 1966
1966 establishments in Missouri